Time and Tide is a 1916 American short drama film directed by B. Reeves Eason.

Cast
 Hugh Bennett
 Nell Franzen
 Gayne Whitman (as Alfred Vosburgh)

External links

1916 films
1916 drama films
1916 short films
American silent short films
American black-and-white films
Silent American drama films
Films directed by B. Reeves Eason
1910s American films